Eqbalabad (also Romanized as Eqbālābād; also known as Qjblehābād, Qoblehābād, and Qobolābād) is a village in Kaftarak Rural District, in the Central District of Shiraz County, Fars Province, Iran. At the 2006 census, its population was 532, in 138 families.

References 

Populated places in Shiraz County